Mark Royal (born 16 March 1988) is a New Zealand rugby union player who plays for Counties Manukau in the National Provincial Championship. His playing position is prop.

Reference list

External links
itsrugby.co.uk profile

1988 births
New Zealand rugby union players
Living people
Rugby union props
North Harbour rugby union players
Counties Manukau rugby union players